Stadionul Comunal is a multi-use stadium in Pojorâta, Romania. It is used mostly for football matches and is the home ground of FC Pojorâta. The stadium holds 1,000 people.

References

Football venues in Romania
Buildings and structures in Suceava County